Splanchnonema is a genus of fungi in the family Pleomassariaceae. The genus was circumscribed in 1829 by August Carl Joseph Corda. One of the species, Splanchnonema lichenisatum, is a lichen.

Species
 Splanchnonema annonae 
 Splanchnonema arbuti 
 Splanchnonema argus 
 Splanchnonema atroinquinans 
 Splanchnonema bauhiniae 
 Splanchnonema britzelmayrianum 
 Splanchnonema clandestinum 
 Splanchnonema dasylirii 
 Splanchnonema foedans 
 Splanchnonema hesperium 
 Splanchnonema hicoria 
 Splanchnonema horizontale 
 Splanchnonema juglandis 
 Splanchnonema lichenisatum 
 Splanchnonema loricatum 
 Splanchnonema maximum 
 Splanchnonema melanterum 
 Splanchnonema monospermum 
 Splanchnonema mori 
 Splanchnonema nolinae 
 Splanchnonema phyllanthicola 
 Splanchnonema platani 
 Splanchnonema pupula 
 Splanchnonema quinqueseptatum 
 Splanchnonema scoriadeum 
 Splanchnonema semitectum 
 Splanchnonema sporadicum 
 Splanchnonema striatulum 
 Splanchnonema superans 
 Splanchnonema ulmicola 
 Splanchnonema vaccinii 
 Splanchnonema verruculospora

References

Pleosporales
Dothideomycetes genera
Taxa named by August Carl Joseph Corda
Taxa described in 1829